Harold Edward "Harry" Kane (5 July 1903 – 30 May 1962) was an Australian politician.

He was born in Wangaratta to estate agent Daniel Kane and Martha Hannah Williams. He attended Essendon High School and worked for the Victorian Primary Producers Co-operative Society until around 19033, when he became a farmer at Diggers Rest and then Gisborne. On 16 December 1934 he married Beryl Irma Sanders, with whom he had three sons. He inherited his father's estate agency, and also served on Broadmeadows Shire Council from 1939 to 1946 (as president from 1945 to 1946). In 1955 he was elected to the Victorian Legislative Assembly as the Liberal and Country Party member for Broadmeadows. He served until his death at Essendon in 1962.

References

1903 births
1962 deaths
Liberal Party of Australia members of the Parliament of Victoria
Members of the Victorian Legislative Assembly
20th-century Australian politicians
People from Wangaratta